Murder Among the Mormons is an American true crime documentary television miniseries following Mark Hofmann, one of the most notable forgers in history, who created forgeries related to the Latter Day Saint movement. Joe Berlinger serves as an executive producer. It consists of three episodes and premiered on Netflix on March 3, 2021.

Plot
The series follows Hofmann, one of the most accomplished forgers in history, who created forgeries related to the Latter-day Saint movement. Hofmann created explosive devices resulting in two deaths, and was exposed as a forger and sent to prison.

Episodes

Production
In 2017, Jared Hess and Tyler Measom began conducting research on the story, met with those who participated in the series and attempted to contact Hofmann, who did not respond to requests for an interview. The series was initially pitched as a six-episode series; however, when Netflix and BBC Studios joined the project, it was reduced to three episodes.

Reception
On Rotten Tomatoes, the series holds an approval rating of 88% based on 16 reviews, with an average rating of 7.29/10. The website's critical consensus reads, "Investigating an outrageous but true story with restraint, Murder Among the Mormons is entertaining true-crime pulp and a fascinating examination of a community." On Metacritic, it has a weighted average score of 74 out of 100, based on eight critics, indicating "generally favorable reviews". In the week of its debut, the show was ranked third overall for original-content Video on Demand streaming, with 587 million minutes streamed, according to Neilson.

References

External links
 
 

2021 American television series debuts
2021 American television series endings
2020s American documentary television series
Documentary television series about crime in the United States
English-language Netflix original programming
Netflix original documentary television series
Television series by BBC Studios
Television series created by Joe Berlinger
Works about the Latter Day Saint movement
Works about criminals